Cho Woo-seok (born 8 October 1968) is a South Korean footballer.

Football career
Cho started professional football club career with Ilhwa Chunma in 1991. He was awarded as Rookie of the Year of 1991 season.

Honours 
Individual
 K-League Rookie of the Year Award : 1991

References

External links
 

1968 births
Living people
K League 1 players
Place of birth missing (living people)
Association football defenders
South Korean footballers
Seongnam FC players